The  is an electric multiple unit (EMU) train type in Japan rebuilt from two former Kintetsu 12200 series EMUs in 2011 for use on tourist charter services in the Osaka and Nagoya areas under the name  operated by the Kintetsu Corporation group company Club Tourism from 23 December 2011.

Design
Two former Kintetsu 12200 series 2-car EMU sets (Mo 12241 + Ku 12341 and Mo 12242 + Ku 12342) were rebuilt in 2011 to become new 15400 series sets. These are repainted in a new dark green livery with gold lining.

Formation
The two 2-car sets are formed as follows, with the Mo 15400 car at the Osaka end.

The Mc cars are fitted with two PT42 lozenge-type pantographs.

Interior
The rebuilt trains feature carpeted floors and new toilets with heated seats.

History

The 15400 series train was officially unveiled in a ceremony at Ōsaka Uehommachi Station on 15 December 2011, at which the train's new name, "Kagirohi", was also announced.

The train is scheduled to enter revenue service from 23 December 2011.

See also
 Joyful Train, the generic name for excursion train sets operated by the JR Group

References

External links

 Official Club Tourism website 

Electric multiple units of Japan
15400 series
Train-related introductions in 2011

ja:近鉄12000系電車#15400系
1500 V DC multiple units of Japan
Kinki Sharyo multiple units